Valerii Ivashchenko (* 30 July 1956, Zaporizhia) — Deputy Minister of Defense of Ukraine in 2007–2009, Acting Minister from 2009 to 2010. Colonel stock.

Biography 
Ivashchenko born 30 July 1956 in Zaporizhia. In 1978 he graduated from the Military Engineering Academy named after Mozhaiskogo. His service began at the spaceport "Baikonur."

From 1978 to 1993, he served in military engineering and command positions in spaceport "Baikonur" and "Plesetsk." In 1993 he graduated from the Military Academy. Dzerzhinsky. In 1993–1995, served on the positions at the headquarters of the Ministry of Defense of Ukraine arms.

From 1995 to 1996 — Head of the Center of Administrative Management Group's strategic nuclear forces of the Ministry of Defense of Ukraine. From 1996 to 2000, he worked in the Office of Military mobilization work and law enforcement agencies of the Cabinet of Ministers of Ukraine.

In 2000–2001 — State Expert management of foreign national security aspects of the National Security and Defense Council of Ukraine. From 2001 to 2003, served as head of the department of the State Committee on Military-Industrial Complex of Ukraine.

From 2003 to 2005 — Head of the Department of Defence and Industry Policy Secretariat of the Cabinet of Ministers of Ukraine. In 2005 — Deputy Head of the Department of Industrial Policy of the Cabinet of Ministers of Ukraine.

In 2005–2007 — Deputy Head of service security and defense policy — Head of the Defence Office of the President of Ukraine.

From October 2007 to June 2009, he was Deputy Minister of Defence of Ukraine. Following the resignation of Yekhanurov order from the Cabinet of Ministers of Ukraine No. 604-r dated 5 June 2009 was appointed First Deputy Minister of Defence of Ukraine in March 2010, and served as Minister of Defense of Ukraine.

From November 2012 to November 2019, he lived in Denmark, Copenhagen and worked at the Royal Danish Defense Academy.

From August 2020 to September 2021 – First Deputy Minister of Strategic Industries of Ukraine.

He is married. He has a son and a daughter.

The criminal case 
21 August 2010, Ivashchenko was detained by the Military Prosecutor. He was accused of illegally deciding on Sale of Assets Feodosia ship & mechanical plant. 24 August he was arrested.

In June 2011, Ivashchenko announced an indefinite hunger strike in protest against the bias of the panel of judges, but soon stopped the hunger strike due to health. Ivashchenko Lawyers filed a complaint with the European Court of Human Rights iin relation to a violation of pre-trial and during the trial. In an interview with "Kommersant" Ivashchenko said he had no relation to the sale of property alienation and CRS.

On April 12, 2012, he was a district court in Kyiv sentenced to five years imprisonment. [2] 

Ivashchenko said that his case was fabricated by former Deputy Attorney General Vitaly Shchetkin. 

The USA and the European Union criticized the judgment and spoke of "selective justice". [3] 

A European Parliament mission led by former Polish President Aleksander Kwaśniewski investigated several trials and criminal judgments in Ukraine in the summer of 2012 (including those against Iwaschtschenko and against Julija Tymoshenko and Yuriy Lutsenko) and criticized the Ukrainian judiciary in the process. [4] 

On August 14, 2012, an appellate court reduced Ivashchenko's sentence to a one-year prison sentence, which was suspended and released from custody in the courtroom.

Ivashchenko fled to Denmark, and in January 2013, the Danish government granted him and his wife political asylum.

On April 4, 2014, the court of first instance, in the same composition as on 12 April 2012, canceled its sentence for Ivashchenko.

External links 
 Biography

1956 births
Living people
Politicians from Zaporizhzhia
Ukrainian politicians convicted of crimes
Military personnel from Zaporizhzhia
Defence ministers of Ukraine
Recipients of the Order of Bohdan Khmelnytsky, 3rd class
Recipients of the Order of Danylo Halytsky
Prisoners and detainees of Ukraine
Ukrainian prisoners and detainees